Acton may refer to:

Places

Antarctica
 Mount Acton

Australia
 Acton, Australian Capital Territory, a suburb of Canberra
 Acton, Tasmania, a suburb of Burnie
 Acton Park, Tasmania, a suburb of Hobart, Tasmania, formerly known as Acton

Canada
 Acton, Ontario, a community
 Acton Island, District of Muskoka, Ontario
 Acton, New Brunswick
 Acton Regional County Municipality, Quebec

New Zealand 
 Acton, New Zealand, a rural community

United Kingdom
 Acton, County Armagh, Northern Ireland, a hamlet and townland
 Acton, Cheshire, a village and civil parish
 Acton, Cheshire (ancient parish)
 Acton, Dorset, a hamlet
 Acton, London, an area of west London
 East Acton
 North Acton
 South Acton, London
 West Acton
 Municipal Borough of Acton, former local government district
 Acton (UK Parliament constituency)
 Acton, Northumberland, a hamlet
 Acton, Shropshire, a village
 Acton, Staffordshire, a hamlet
 Acton, Suffolk, a village and civil parish
 Acton, Worcestershire
 Acton, Wrexham, a local government community

United States
 Acton, Alabama, an unincorporated community
 Acton, California, an unincorporated census-designated place
 Acton, Florida, a former town
 Acton, Georgia, an unincorporated community
 Acton, Indiana, a community
 Acton, Kentucky, an unincorporated community
 Acton, Maine, a town
 Acton, Massachusetts, a town
 Acton Township, Meeker County, Minnesota
 Acton, Minnesota, an unincorporated community
 Acton, Montana, an unincorporated community
 Acton, New Jersey, an unincorporated community
 Acton Township, Walsh County, North Dakota
 Acton Lake, Ohio
 Acton, Tennessee, an unincorporated community
 Acton, Texas, an unincorporated community 
 Acton State Historic Site, Texas

Schools
 Acton School of Business, Austin, Texas
 Acton Technical College, Uxbridge, West London, United Kingdom
 Acton High School (Massachusetts), a former American high school, on the National Register of Historic Places
 Ark Acton Academy, in the Acton area of the London Borough of Ealing, England

People
 Acton (surname)
 Acton Bell, a pen name of Anne Brontë (1820–1849), English novelist and poet
 Eugenia de Acton, a pen name of Alethea Lewis (1749–1827), English novelist
 Acton Adams (1843–1924), British politician
 Acton Smee Ayrton (1816–1886), British barrister and politician

Other uses
 Acton Institute, an American think tank
 Acton Capital Partners, an international venture capital fund
 Acton station (disambiguation)
 Baron Acton, a title in the Peerage of the United Kingdom
 Acton Football Club, a defunct Australian rules football club
 Acton (Turrell), an artwork by James Turrell
 The Actons, a family in The Europeans, a Henry James novel
 Acton, a minor character in The Sword of Shannara by Terry Brooks
 Acton, an alternative spelling of aketon (gambeson)

See also
 Acton Castle, near Perranuthnoe, Cornwall
 Acton Green (disambiguation)
 Acton Park (disambiguation)
 Acton Vale (disambiguation)
 Acton Works, a London Underground maintenance facility